Mormon Well Spring is located in the Desert National Wildlife Range and was used from around 1900–1924 for ranching. It is listed on the United States National Register of Historic Places.  Nearby is Corn Creek Campsite, another listed historic place.

Currently the spring is used to provide water for animals using structures provided by the Bureau of Land Management (BLM).

History 
Long prior to its ranching use, the site has indications of Native American use, by such as the Southern Paiute people, from 1000 AD to 1900 AD.

The site was listed on the National Register of Historic Places on December 24, 1974.

References 

Native American history of Nevada
Southern Paiute
Archaeological sites in Nevada
National Register of Historic Places in Clark County, Nevada